Alberti is a northern central partido of Buenos Aires Province, Argentina, at coordinates  

Alberti is located at the south of the Gran Buenos Aires urban area. It has an area of 1,130 km² (436 sq mi) and 10,322 inhabitants.

Economy
The economy of Alberti is dominated by agriculture. Its main products are wheat, maize, soya beans, oats, sunflowers, sorghum, and industrial crops.

Attractions
 Raúl Lozza Gallery of Contemporary Art, Alberti
 Parque Municipal (Municipal park), Alberti

Settlements

Alberti (Capital) (7,493 inhabitants)
Achupallas (112 inhabitants)
Anderson
Baudrix
Villa Ortíz, Estación Coronel Mom (857 inhabitants)
Coronel Seguí (148 inhabitants)
Gobernador Ugarte
Mechita (438 inhabitants)
Larrea
Emita
Palantelén
Plá (237 inhabitants)
Presidente Quintana
Villa Grisolía
Villa María (21 inhabitants)

External links

 
 Ministry of the Interior statistics

1910 establishments in Argentina
Partidos of Buenos Aires Province
Populated places established in 1910